Paul Luiz van Eijk (born 16 March 1986, in Cook Islands) is a footballer of Dutch ancestry who plays as a defender. He currently plays for Nikao Sokattack.

International career
Van Eijk made his debut for Cook Islands at the FIFA World Cup qualification 2003. He made his debut in the match against New Caledonia on 17 May 2004.

External links

1986 births
Living people
Cook Islands international footballers
Association football defenders
Cook Island footballers
Puaikura FC players
New Zealand people of Dutch descent